Debora Rabbai (born January 14) is an American voice actress based in New York City.

Biography 
Rabbai is a graduate of the American Academy of Dramatic Arts.

She is best known as the voice of Aika Sumeragi from Agent Aika, Rika Sena from Kare Kano, Hakufu Sonsaku from Ikki Tousen: Dragon Destiny, Leina from the Queen's Blade series, as well as Futaba Murata and Nayuta Moriyama from Shingu.

Rabbai is an accomplished improv comedian, and is the producer, co-creator and a performer in the musical comedy Broadway's Next Hit Musical!. She teaches improv comedy at the American Comedy Institute.

Dubbing roles

Anime

Video games

References

External links

Debora Rabbai at CrystalAcids English Voice Actor & Production Staff Database

Living people
American Academy of Dramatic Arts alumni
American musical theatre actresses
American video game actresses
American voice actresses
American women comedians
Actresses from New York City
20th-century American actresses
21st-century American actresses
21st-century American comedians
20th-century American comedians
1968 births